Engineering is one of the most popular majors among universities in Taiwan. The engineering degrees are over a quarter of the bachelor's degrees in Taiwan. Because high-technology manufacturing is the main industry in Taiwan, there are many career opportunities for engineering majors in the country.

Engineering Majors

Out of the top fifty popular majors in Taiwanese Universities, there are eleven engineering majors in the list.

National Engineering Universities 

National Taiwan University (NTU)
National Taiwan University of Science and Technology (NTUST)
National Dong Hwa University (NDHU)
National Taipei University of Technology (NTUT)
National Taiwan Ocean University (NTOU)
National Central University (NCU)
National Chiao Tung University (NCTU)
National Tsing Hua University (NTHU)
National Chung Cheng University (CCU)
National Cheng Kung University (NCKU)
Shu-Te University (STU) 
National Kaohsiung Marine University (NKMU)
National Sun Yat-sen University (NSYU)

See also

Engineering education
Nuclear power in Taiwan
Institute of Engineering Education Taiwan
Education in Taiwan

References

External links
 Electronics - Taiwan 2.0 - The island’s electronics firms are in need of an upgrade - The Economist

Education in Taiwan
Engineering education